Kemblawarra Fury is a former football club based in Dapto and Kemblawarra in New South Wales. The Dapto club was established in 2012 and merged with Kemblawarra in 2016. They were dissolved in 2017.

History
In early 2012, Champion Premier League side Dandaloo Football Club made an agreement to amalgamate with their local derby rivals and recently relegated Div. 1 team the Dapto Soccer Club. This created a new entity titled "Dapto Dandaloo Fury.

On 26 September 2017, the club posted a statement on their Facebook page saying, the club "will close operations at the completion of the financial year at our Annual General Meeting."

Honours
 2012 Illawarra Mercury Premier League – Winners
 2012 Illawarra Mercury Premier League Grand Final – Winners
 2012 Fraternity Cup – Winners
 2012 Bampton Cup – Winners
 2015 Illawarra Mercury Premier League – Winners

External links
 Club Home Page
 Facebook

References

Soccer clubs in Wollongong
Illawarra Premier League
Association football clubs established in 2012
2012 establishments in Australia